Weaste and Seedley is an electoral ward of Salford, England. It is represented in Westminster by Rebecca Long-Bailey MP for Salford and Eccles. A profile of the ward conducted by Salford City Council in 2014 recorded a population of 12,616.

Councillors 
The ward is represented by three councillors: Ronnie Wilson (Lab Co-op), Paul Wilson (Lab), and Stephen Hesling (Lab).

 indicates seat up for re-election.

Elections in 2010s

May 2018

May 2016

May 2015

May 2014

By-election 10 October 2013

By-election 20 June 2013

May 2012

May 2011

May 2010

Elections in 2000s

References 

Salford City Council Wards